Woman Doctors is a 1984 East German crime film directed by Horst Seemann. It was entered into the 34th Berlin International Film Festival. It is based upon the play by Rolf Hochhuth.

Plot
Dr. Lydia Kowalenko is fired from the research department of a large pharmaceutical company after refusing to cover up the problems with a recent product.

Cast
 Judy Winter as Dr. Katia Michelsberg
 Inge Keller as Dr. Lydia Kowalenko
 Walter Reyer as Dr. Riemenschild
 Rolf Hoppe as Dr. Boeblinger
 Daniel Jacob as Thomas 'Tom' Michelsberg
 Michael Gwisdek as Dr. Werner Michelsberg
 Käthe Reichel as Dr. Plauner
 Wolfgang Dehler as Kuno
 Horst Schulze as Prosecutor
 John Harryson as Dr. Johanson
 Barbara Dittus as Sekretärin
 Christoph Engel as Dr. Zillner
 Hartmut Puls as Dr. Haase
 Leon Niemczyk as Polnischer Arzt
 Gerlinde Bölke as Gunhild Klippel

References

External links

1984 films
1984 crime drama films
East German films
West German films
Swedish crime drama films
Swiss crime drama films
German crime drama films
1980s German-language films
Films directed by Horst Seemann
German films based on plays
1980s German films
1980s Swedish films